Hu Mei (胡美, born 9 April 1987) is a retired Chinese rhythmic gymnast. She represented China at the 2004 Summer Olympics.

Hu Mei married basketball player Zhu Fangyu, whom she met at the 2004 Summer Olympics, from 2008 to 2013.  They have two children.  They were divorced c. 2014.

References
 Hu Mei Bio, Stats, and Results

Chinese rhythmic gymnasts
People from Nanning
1987 births
Olympic gymnasts of China
Gymnasts at the 2004 Summer Olympics
Gymnasts from Guangxi
living people
20th-century Chinese women
21st-century Chinese women